Performance test or performance testing may refer to:

 Performance test (assessment), an assessment requiring the subject to perform a task or activity
 Performance test (bar exam), a section of the bar exam simulating a real-life legal task
 Software performance testing, a procedure to determine how a system performs under a particular workload

See also
 Performance (disambiguation)